Galicia Socialista was a clandestine anti-francoist group that operated in Galicia, mainly in the city of Vigo.

History
The group was founded by Camilo Nogueira and Xan López Facal, and was basically composed of industrial workers, especially from the Citroën factory of Vigo, were they tried unsuccessfully to create a Galician nationalist union. Galicia Socialista also had a relevant presence in Santiago de Compostela, mainly among college students.

Originally, the group maintained contacts with the Popular Liberation Front (FLP) and worked within Comisiones Obreras (CCOO). In 1972 Galicia Socialista broke with the Spanish movements and joined the Galician People's Union (UPG). Many of its political cadres would later participate in the foundation of the Galician Workers Party (POG).

References

Justo Beramendi and Xosé Manoel Núñez Seixas. O nacionalismo galego. A Nosa Terra. Vigo

1968 establishments in Spain
1972 disestablishments in Spain
Anti-Francoism
Defunct socialist parties in Galicia (Spain)
Galician nationalist parties
Left-wing nationalist parties
Political parties disestablished in 1972
Political parties established in 1968